Maralnik-1 is a rural locality (a settlement) in Ust-Koksinsky District, the Altai Republic, Russia. The population was 56 as of 2016. There are 2 streets.

Geography 
Maralnik-1 is located 43 km southeast of Ust-Koksa (the district's administrative centre) by road. Multa is the nearest rural locality.

References 

Rural localities in Ust-Koksinsky District